Popowicz is a Polish surname. Notable people include:

 Eugeniusz Popowicz (born 1961), Polish Archbishop-Metropolitan of Ukrainian Catholic Archeparchy of Przemyśl–Warsaw
 Dariusz Popowicz, Acid Drinkers lead guitarist
 Jan Popowicz (born 1948), Polish archer
 Maciej Popowicz (born 1984), Polish creator of nasza-klasa.pl and Ten Square Games
 Marika Popowicz-Drapała (born 1988), Polish track and field athlete

See also 
 Popović

Polish-language surnames